Crowther is a surname, derived from the old Welsh musical instrument the crwth. Notable people with the surname include:

 Arnold Crowther, stage-magician, puppeteer, and promoter of Wicca religion
 Arthur Crawford (1835-1911) British administrator in India, municipal commissioner and collector
 Antony Crowther, British computer programmer
 Bosley Crowther (1905–1981), American film critic
 Charles Crowther (1831–1894), Australian politician (Western Australia)
 Edward Lodewyk Crowther (1843–1931), Australian politician (Tasmania), son of William Lodewyk Crowther
 Emlyn Crowther (born 1949), New Zealand drummer
 Eunice Crowther (1916–1986), British singer, dancer, and choreographer
 Frank Crowther (1870–1955), Member of US House of Representatives
 Geoffrey Crowther, Baron Crowther (1907–1972), editor of The Economist
 Hal Crowther (born 1945), American journalist and essayist
 Hilton Crowther (b.1879), English mill owner and football club chairman
 James Crowther (1899–1983), English science writer
 John Edward Crowther (1863–1931),  English mill owner and philanthropist
 Jonathan Crowther (1942), British crossword compiler
 Jonathan Crowther (1853-1926), Orange Free State Boer war general
 Jonathan Crowther (minister) (1794–1856), English Wesleyan Methodist minister in Britain and India
 Joseph Stretch Crowther (1820–93), English architect
 Leslie Crowther (1933–1996), English comedian
 Liz Crowther (born 1954), English actress
 Patricia Crowther (born 1943), American cave explorer
 Paul Crowther (born 1953), English professor of philosophy
 Patricia Crowther (born 1927), promoter of Wicca religion
 Samuel Ajayi Crowther (1809–1891), Nigerian bishop
 Stan Crowther (footballer) (born 1935), English footballer
 Stanley Crowther (1925–2013), English politician
 Steve Crowther, English politician
 Thomas Crowther evangelical clergyman in the Church of England.
 Thomas Crowther, British ecologist
 Thomas Crowther, British judge
 Welles Crowther (1977–2001), American equities trader and volunteer firefighter known for saving lives during the 9/11 attacks.  
 William Crowther (born 1936), American computer programmer
 William Lodewyk Crowther (1817–1885), Australian politician (Tasmania), father of Edward Lodewyk Crowther
 William Crowther (1834 – 1900), New Zealand politician

See also
Crowther, New South Wales, a locality in Australia
 W. L. Crowther Library, at the State Library of Tasmania

English-language surnames
Surnames of Welsh origin
Welsh-language surnames